Zenon Małłysko (16 February 1898 – 20 April 1957) was a Polish modern pentathlete. He competed at the 1928 Summer Olympics.

References

External links
 

1898 births
1957 deaths
Polish male modern pentathletes
Olympic modern pentathletes of Poland
Modern pentathletes at the 1928 Summer Olympics
People from Opole Lubelskie County
Sportspeople from Lublin Voivodeship